Epidendrum ramosum, the mountain star orchid, is a neotropical species of reed-stemmed Epidendrum orchid which grows both epiphytically and terrestrially at altitudes near 1 km.

Description 
Epidendrum ramosum stems do not swell into pseudobulbs, are highly branched, and are covered with close, tubular sheathes, the upper ones bearing longish leaves which are rounded at the apex.  The short, scaly, apical peduncle bears a raceme with large, alternate floral bracts which nearly cover the long pedicellate ovaries of the few green-yellow flowers.  The sepals are oblong-acute, 5–6 mm long and 2 mm wide; the petals are narrower.  The cordate acute lip is adnate to the column to its apex, has no lateral lobes, and bears a callus consisting of two keel-like ridges near the column apex.  The four pollinia are white.

Homonymy 
Five varieties of E. ramosum have been published, three of which are now recognized as separate species:
 E. ramosum var. imbricatum Ames, F.T.Hubb. & C.Schweinf is a synonym for E. paranaense Barb.Rodr.
 E. ramosum var. lanceolatum Griseb. is a synonym for E. antillanum Ackerman & Hágsater
 E. ramosum var. mixtum (Schltr.) Ames, F.T.Hubb & C.Schweinf. is a synonym for E. mixtum Schltr.

References

External links 

ramosum
Taxa named by Nikolaus Joseph von Jacquin
Orchids of Central America
Orchids of Belize